James Evan Bruce Baillie (1859 – 6 May 1931) was Unionist MP for Inverness-shire. He was elected at a by-election in 1895, was re-elected in the general election later that year, but stood down in 1900.

References 

1859 births
1931 deaths
Members of the Parliament of the United Kingdom for Highland constituencies
UK MPs 1892–1895
UK MPs 1895–1900
Scottish Tory MPs (pre-1912)